Wilcox may refer to:

Places
Canada
Wilcox, Saskatchewan
United States
Wilcox, Florida, an unincorporated community in Gilchrist County, Florida
Wilcox, Missouri
Wilcox, Nebraska
Wilcox, Pennsylvania
Wilcox, Washington
Wilcox, Wisconsin
Wilcox County, Alabama
Wilcox County, Georgia
Wilcox Township, Michigan
Wilcox, Burleson County, Texas
Wilcox, Somervell County, Texas
Wilcox, Wyoming

People
Wilcox (surname)

Other
Wilcox Formation, a Paleogene age geologic formation in the Gulf of Mexico
Wilcox (film), a 2019 Canadian drama film
Wilcox, Crittenden Mill, a property in Middletown, Connecticut
Adrian C. Wilcox High School, Santa Clara, California, USA
Babcock & Wilcox, American manufacturer of power generation equipment
George Wilcox & Co, a South Australian hide and wool business, which became Wilcox Mofflin Ltd.
Wilcox Group, Canadian crisis management company
Wilcox Health, Hospital and medical group in Hawaii
Wilcox rebellions, rebellions in the Hawaiian sovereignty movement
The Wilcoxon signed-rank test, a statistical test
Snell & Wilcox, digital media products manufacturer

See also
Willcox (disambiguation)